Hahncappsia entephrialis is a moth in the family Crambidae described by William Schaus in 1912. It is found in Costa Rica.

The wingspan is about 25 mm. Adults have been recorded on wing in October.

References

Moths described in 1912
Pyraustinae